Terellia longicauda is a species of tephritid or fruit flies in the genus Neaspilota of the family Tephritidae.

Distribution
United Kingdom, Central Europe, Siberia, Spain, Balkans and Iran.

References

Tephritinae
Insects described in 1838
Diptera of Africa
Diptera of Europe